Margit Varga (1908–2005) was an American artist, gallerist, journalist, art director, and art editor. Her artwork has been described as "magical realism" and her work was known in the New York City-area and in Europe. Varga owned a Midtown art gallery for emerging artists in the 1930s. She was an art authority and served as a judge for art exhibitions in the 1930s and 1940s. For 40 years Varga worked for Time magazine.

Biography 
Margit Varga was born on May 5, 1908, in the Upper East Side in New York City, to parents from Hungary. She studied art at the National Academy of Design; and at the Art Students League of New York, under Boardman Johnson and Robert Laurent.

She owned the Painters' and Sculptors' Gallery at 22 East 11th Street in Midtown in 1932. The gallery showed emerging artists for the next 3 years. Varga worked for 40 years as an art editor and art director of Time magazine, starting in 1936.

Varga died on April 8, 2005, in Naples, Florida. Her artwork can be found in museum collections including the Museum of Fine Arts, Boston, Pennsylvania Academy of the Fine Arts, the Metropolitan Museum of Art, and Gilcrease Museum.

References

External links 
 Margit Varga papers, 1931-1985 from Archives of American Art, Smithsonian Institution

1908 births
2005 deaths
American women painters
American art directors
People from the Upper East Side
Art Students League of New York alumni
National Academy of Design alumni
American people of Hungarian descent
Artists from New York City
20th-century American women artists